"Let You Know" is a song by South African record producer Sketchy Bongo and South African singer Shekhinah. It was released on 6 April 2016 by Ultra Music and the song is featured on Sketchy Bongo's debut album Unmasked.

Charts

"Let You Know" peaked at number 2 on South Africa's official music chart.

Music video
The music video for "Let You Know" was released via Ultra Music's YouTube account on April 13, 2016 and has over a million views.

References 

2016 songs
2016 singles
Shekhinah (singer) songs
Electronic songs